The Wasenhorn is a mountain of the Bernese Alps, located north of Blitzingen in the canton of Valais. It lies on the range south of the Oberaarrothorn, that separates the valley of the Fiescher Glacier from the main Rhone valley.

References

External links
 Wasenhorn on Hikr

Mountains of the Alps
Alpine three-thousanders
Mountains of Switzerland
Mountains of Valais
Bernese Alps